Nelly's Version is a 1983 British mystery film directed by Maurice Hatton and starring Eileen Atkins, Anthony Bate and Nicholas Ball. It was based on a novel by Eva Figes. The screenplay concerns a woman who turns up a hotel having lost her memory and forgotten who she is.

Cast
 Eileen Atkins ...  Nelly 
 Anthony Bate ...  George 
 Barbara Jefford ...  Ms. Wyckham 
 Nicholas Ball ...  Insp. Leach
 George A. Cooper ...  Douglas McKenzie 
 Elena David ...  Ms. Monroe 
 Brian Deacon ...  David 
 Andy de la Tour ...  Station porter 
 Ann Firbank ...  Patricia McKenzie 
 Marsha Fitzalan ...  Susan 
 Hugh Fraser ...  Brush salesman 
 Darcy Hare ...  Twin 
 Lewis Hare ...  Twin 
 William Hoyland ...  Assistant bank manager 
 Miki Iveria ...  Mrs. Knatchbull
 Nizwar Karanj ...  Hotel porter 
 Stella Maris ...  Carmelita 
 Hilton McRae ...  Vagrant
 Susannah York ...  Narrator (voice)

Reception 
A Variety review called the film "art that droops with symbolism and lacks the narrative thrust to assure broad appeal, even in art house locations". The musical score was criticized, though the way the camerawork emphasized a character's sense of alienation was praised".

References

External links

1983 films
British mystery films
Films directed by Maurice Hatton
1980s English-language films
1980s British films